Chingari may refer to:

 Chingari (1940 film), a 1940 Hindi film
 Chingari (1971 film), a 1971 Bollywood film
 Chingari (2012 film), a 2012 Kannada film
 Chingari (app), Indian mobile app